"Something Different" is a song by the rock band Godsmack. It served as the second single from the band's sixth studio album 1000hp. The song was released in September 2014.

Track listing

Charts

References

2014 singles
2014 songs
Godsmack songs
Universal Republic Records singles
Songs written by Sully Erna